Club Social y Deportivo Colo-Colo is a Chilean professional football club based in Macul, Santiago. Founded in 1925 by David Arellano they play in the Chilean Primera División, from which they have never been relegated. The team has played its home games at Estadio Monumental David Arellano since 1989. Colo-Colo is regarded as the most successful club of Chilean football.

Colo-Colo has won 33 Primera División de Chile titles, more than any other Chilean club and a record thirteen Copa Chile titles. It was the first Chilean team to win a continental tournament, winning the 1991 Copa Libertadores The following year, the club went on to win a further two international titles, the 1992 Recopa Sudamericana and the 1992 Copa Interamericana,

The club's all time top scorer is Esteban Paredes with 216 goals, and the player with most appearances is the former goalkeeper Misael Escuti with 417 games. Luis Mena, dubbed the "historic one", won eleven titles for the club, a Chilean league record.

Colo-Colo is most supported team in Chile, and holds a long-standing rivalry with Universidad de Chile. The club also holds a traditional rivalry in matches against Cobreloa and Universidad Católica. The IFFHS ranked the team in 14th place in 2007. In 2009, the IFFHS also named the team as the top club in Chile for the 20th century, and one of the top twenty clubs in South American football history.

History

1925–1933: Foundation and early years

The team was founded in early 1925 by Magallanes' footballer David Arellano, who led a group of young players leaving that club after institutional problems. Finally, on 19 April, Arellano and the other youths officially established the institutions after meetings and negotiations, where Luis Contreras chose the name Colo-Colo for the club, which refers to the eponymous Mapuche cacique Colo Colo.

The team began to play friendly games, but in 1926, Colo-Colo took part in the Metropolitan League of Honour, where they were proclaimed champions (unbeaten) and earned the nickname of "invincible". The following year, Colo-Colo became the first Chilean football team to participate in a tour across Europe. However, on 2 May, during an exhibition match against Real Unión Deportiva at Valladolid, the team founder and captain David Arellano was critically injured after suffering a collision with an opposing player, which caused him peritonitis. The inflammation led him to his death the next day. Despite the great impact caused by Arellano's death, the club won the Central League of football tournament – then renamed Asociación de Football de Santiago – in the 1928, 1929 and 1930 seasons.

In the 1931–32 season, Colo-Colo suffered its first institutional crisis due to financial problems, which led to a salary reduction for first team footballers and board members, with their consequent resistance. That season the team played another tournament final against Audax Italiano. However, due to a platform collapse at Estadio Italiano and the subsequent fracas between the fans, it was decided that the game would be suspended. In that moment, Colo-Colo were winning 2–1. That day's tragedy resulted in 130 injuries and three deaths. The match was cancelled and the champion position for that year remained vacant. Other authors however declared that both Audax Italiano and Colo-Colo were declared champions.

1933–1973: Beginnings in professional football
In 1933, Colo-Colo alongside six clubs from Santiago decided to create the Chilean professional football league. On 23 July, the team won the Campeonato de Apertura (Copa Chile precursor), after defeating 2–1 to Unión Española. However, in the first Primera División official tournament, Colo-Colo finished first alongside Magallanes, which forced the "Cacique" to play a tie-breaker match. That match was lost 2–1 by Colo-Colo. In 1937 the team was undefeated, and reached its first league title. Two seasons later, in 1939, Colo-Colo won the league title for a second time, now under the guidance of the Hungarian coach Francisco Platko, and with Alfonso Domínguez as goalscorer with 20 goals in 24 matches. After another title in 1941 with Platko as coach, the club went on to win the titles of 1944 and 1947. The following year Colo-Colo organized the South American Club Championship – Copa Libertadores background – in Santiago, which brought together the 1947 continent's champions. In 1945, the club had the worst season in its history, finishing penultimate in eleventh place only ahead of weak Badminton.

In the early 1950s, club's president Antonio Labán hired Newcastle United striker George Robledo, paying £25,000 for its signing. Robledo's performances led the team to the titles of 1953 and 1956. During that age, the club acquired a terrain at Macul, where began the construction of Estadio Monumental. Besides the acquisition, the directive invested in a headquarters located at Santiago Centro (located at Cienfuegos 41) in 1953. The next decade Colo-Colo win the titles of 1960 and 1963. The 1963 team broke two top-tier records: Luis Hernán Álvarez scored 37 goals in a single season (the highest number of goals scored by a Colo-Colo footballer during a season) and the netting of the highest number of goals scored by a club in a season (130). The team won its tenth honour in 1970.

Colo-Colo 1973 and 1980s dominance 
In 1972, now under the orders of coach Luis Álamos and with figures like Carlos Caszely and Francisco Valdés, the club won another championship. It also obtained the country's attendance record of 45,929 people for a single season. That team was the basis of the so-called "Colo-Colo 73", the first Chilean team to reach a Copa Libertadores final, where it lost against Independiente of Argentina. After Colo-Colo's brilliant campaign, the club went into a competitiveness and institutional crisis not being able to win another league title until 1979. That team featured the talented Brazilian midfielder Severino Vasconcelos alongside a returning Caszely. Nevertheless, in 1975, the construction of Estadio Monumental was finished and the stadium was inaugurated in a league match against Deportes Aviación, but due to problems with the infrastructure and other basic services the stadium was indefinitely closed.

In the 1980s, the club obtained the league titles of 1981 and 1983 with coach Pedro García, and the 1986 and 1989 honours under Arturo Salah. The 1987 Alianza Lima air disaster claimed the lives of sixteen players and Colo-Colo was the first to help the Peruvian team, loaning them 4 players. Nonetheless, the team won four Copa Chile titles in that decade. During that period, the greatest disappointment was at the continental tournament level with the team only exceeding the first stage in the 1988 Copa Libertadores. On 30 September 1989, the Estadio Monumental was re-inaugurated in an exhibition match against Peñarol, which Colo-Colo won 2–1 with goals by Marcelo Barticciotto and Leonel Herrera, the son of a 1970s legendary former defender of the same name.

1991–1999: International success 

The 1990s was the most successful decade in the club's history for the national and international honours achieved. Croatian Mirko Jozić arrived as coach, leading the team towards its first Bicampeonato for winning two national titles in a row. On 5 June 1991, after beating Olimpia 3–0 at Monumental with two goals by Luis Pérez and one by Leonel Herrera, Colo-Colo became the first Chilean team to win a Copa Libertadores. That same season, the "Albos" lost the Intercontinental Cup final against Yugoslavian club Red Star Belgrade, after being defeated 3–0 in Tokyo. At the local level, the club won the 1991 league, its third-consecutive title thus achieving its first Tricampeonato. The following season, the club won the Recopa Sudamericana, after beating Brazil's Cruzeiro in a penalty shootout, and also obtained the Copa Interamericana, after winning 3–1 against Puebla in Mexico. The last title won by Jozić in Colo-Colo was the 1993 league title, thus closing a successful spell in South America.

After Jozić's departure came a brief drought in national titles, but the team managed to get an unforgettable 3–0 win over arch rivals Universidad de Chile in 1995. The team was champion of the 1994 Copa Chile and reached the 1994 Copa Libertadores quarterfinals. The following season saw the arrival of Paraguayan coach Gustavo Benítez, who obtained the 1996, 1997-C and 1998 league titles. The team advanced to the semifinals of the Supercopa Libertadores in 1996, and of the Copa Libertadores in 1997, being eliminated both times by Cruzeiro. In 1999, Colo-Colo relived something like 1994, finishing fourth in the Chilean league and having three coaches during that single season: Brazilian Nelsinho Baptista, the caretaker manager Carlos Durán and then Fernando Morena of Uruguay, who remained until 2001.

1999–present: Bankruptcy and recovery 
In 1999, after Benítez's departure, the club entered a serious financial crisis. On 23 January 2002, after years of economic mismanagement under the leadership of Peter Dragicevic as president, the club was declared bankrupt. Justice named Juan Carlos Saffie as syndic responsible for the institution allowing it not to lose its legal status. Despite the bankruptcy, under Jaime Pizarro as coach – key player in the obtaining of the 1991 Copa Libertadores – Los Albos won the Torneo de Clausura, with an almost completely juvenile squad. Three years later, in 2005, the joint-stock company Blanco y Negro took over the administration, concessioning all club assets for thirty years in exchange for paying all debts through an opening process at the Santiago Stock Exchange. In the first half of 2006, the judiciary court declared the bankruptcy over.

With the Argentine Claudio Borghi as coach since 2006, and with players like Matías Fernández and Humberto Suazo, Colo-Colo obtained a Bicampeonato winning the Apertura and Clausura tournaments. The squad reached another international final, the Copa Sudamericana, losing 2–1 to Mexico's side Pachuca. That season, El Cacique was recognized by the IFFHS as the world's club of the month. The following season Colo-Colo won two more consecutive tournaments, winning a Tetracampeonato for winning four back-to-back championships, being the first Chilean team to achieve that.

After Borghi's departure, the club obtained its 28th title after defeating Palestino in the 2008 Torneo de Clausura finals under the coaching of Marcelo Barticciotto, and with Lucas Barrios as principal scorer, who equaled Luis Hernán Álvarez's record of highest number of goals scored by a Colo-Colo footballer during a single season with 37 goals. The following season, the club became the first professional team to play on Easter Island. After a poor Torneo de Apertura 2009 – not reaching the play-offs for the first time – Los Albos started the Clausura very close to relegation positions. However, the team reached the tournament's finals against Universidad Católica, beating them 4–2 in Santa Laura, with players like Esteban Paredes, Macnelly Torres and Ezequiel Miralles, coached by Hugo Tocalli. Colo-Colo's last championship was in 2014 after winning the Torneo de Clausura. It was the team's 30th Chilean League title.

Badge, colours and kit

The club's badge represents Mapuche chieftain Colo Colo, an important Wall Mapu member who fought in the Arauco War against the Spanish empire (1536–1818). On 19 April 1925, when the club was established, Luis Contreras – one of the players that founded the club – defined the team's badge, in representation of the chief and the country's indigenous people.

Throughout its history, Colo-Colo's uniform has been a white shirt and black shorts. The uniform was originally designed by Juan Quiñones following the recommendations of David Arellano.

In 1927, after Arellano's death while playing against Real Unión Deportiva (currently Real Valladolid), it was decided then that the badge will wear a black horizontal band over it forever, to represent the institution's eternal mourning.

The team's away kits have varied through its history, from green between 1927 and the mid-1970s and to red from 1975 to 1988.

Stadium

Colo-Colo initially played on a field called Estadio El Llano but in January 1928 moved to the Campos de Sports de Ñuñoa. The team later moved to Estadio Nacional where it played from 1939 to the late 1980s. In 1946 the club bought a stadium from Carabineros de Chile – then called Fortín Mapocho – which was closed according security reasons. It was intended to build a 30,000-seat stadium at the site. However, a municipal ordinance prohibited construction in the area. For that reason, Colo-Colo sold the stadium in order to raise funds for the future Estadio Monumental.

In 1956, club's president Antonio Labán acquired a 28 ha terrain at Macul, close to the intersection between Vicuña Mackenna and Departamental. The new stadium was originally planned with a capacity of 120,000. Due to the work's high cost and lack of a government subsidy the project was halted. In 1960, after Chile's successful proposition to hold the World Cup, several congressmen proposed to build a 52,000-seat stadium at Colo-Colo's site. However, the 9.5 Valdivia earthquake and a willingness from congress stopped the initiative.

Colo-Colo's brilliant campaigns in 1972 and 1973 allowed the stadium construction to resume. It was inaugurated in a league match 1975 which Colo-Colo win 1–0 over Deportes Aviación with Juan Carlos Orellana, who become the first player to score a goal in Monumental's history. However, the stadium was closed due to lack of basic services and infrastructure. It was not reopened until 1989 thanks to Hugo Rubio's transfer to Bologna which allowed the club to receive US$1 million to repair the problems mentioned. The stadium was called Monumental David Arellano in honour of its founder and its definitive inauguration was in a match against Uruguay's Peñarol which Colo-Colo won 2–1.

Since its definitive opening, the stadium has seen the 1991 Copa Libertadores and 1992 Copa Interamericana titles as well as several league honors.

Monumental's public record attendance was in 1992 for a derby match with Universidad de Chile which registered an attendance of 70,000 fans approximately. That record was closely followed in August 1993 during a 2–0 exhibition match win over Real Madrid with a 67,543 attendance. Several remodeling works and stricter security brought down the total capacity to 47,347.

The Chile national team usually use the stadium for its games since 1997. The stadium was also used during the 2015 Copa América.

Players

Youth Academy

Out on loan

2023 Summer transfers

In

Out

Managers

Current coaching staff

Supporters and rivalries

Colo-Colo is the club with the largest following in Chile, with approximately 42% of the total Chilean football fans according to research published in August 2012 by Spanish newspaper agency Marca. The study showed a 4% growth in comparison to 2006 research by Fundación Futuro that ranked the club in first place with the 38% of the preferences, leaving its rival Universidad de Chile in second place.

Since the early 1960s, the club has had organized fan groups, which evolved in the mid-1980s into the so-called Garra Blanca. They attended Colo-Colo's games and generally rioted, especially in derbies, turning Estadio Monumental surroundings into battlefields against the military police. In 2000, the group was declared as Barra brava.

Colo-Colo contests rivalries with fellow Santiago clubs Universidad Católica dubbed Clásico Albo-Cruzado and Deportes Magallanes dubbed Clásico de la Chilenidad.

Chilean Superclásico 

Colo-Colo's traditional rival is Universidad de Chile, against which it plays the so-called Chilean Classic or Chilean Superclásico. Although the first confrontation between the two clubs dates back to 1935, the rivalry began to develop in the 1940s and 1950s, with the match played on 11. november 1959 being the climax of a series of disagreements between the two institutions. That match, valid for the definition of that year's title, ended with a 2-1 victory for Universidad de Chile, which was the first of a series of good results for the "Azules" over Colo-Colo. This, added to the dominance of Universidad de Chile in the national championship, only increased the rivalry. In recent years the rivalry between these teams has diminished, leaving Colo-Colo as superior to Universidad de Chile, and because of that, it has been considered as the "most unequal rivalry in the world."

Honours

Leagues
 Liga Central de Football / Asociación de Fútbol de Santiago: 4
1925, 1928, 1929, 1930
Primera División: 33
1937, 1939, 1941, 1944, 1947, 1953, 1956, 1960, 1963, 1970, 1972, 1979, 1981, 1983, 1986, 1989, 1990, 1991, 1993, 1996, 1997-C, 1998, 2002-C, 2006-A, 2006-C, 2007-A, 2007-C, 2008-C, 2009-C, 2014-C, 2015-A, 2017, 2022

Cups
Copa Chile: 13
1958, 1974, 1981, 1982, 1985, 1988, 1989, 1990, 1994, 1996, 2016, 2019, 2021
Supercopa de Chile: 3
2017, 2018, 2022

Continental
Copa Libertadores
Winners (1): 1991
Runner-up (1): 1973
Copa Sudamericana
Runner-up (1): 2006
Copa Interamericana
Winners (1): 1992
Recopa Sudamericana
Winners (1): 1992

International
Intercontinental Cup
Runner-up (1): 1991

See also
 Colo-Colo B
 Colo-Colo (women)

Notes

Citations

Further reading

External links

 Colo Colo in FIFA.com
 Supporters' site

 
1925 establishments in Chile
Association football clubs established in 1925
Chilean Primera División teams
Football clubs in Chile
Sport in Santiago
Unrelegated association football clubs
Copa Libertadores winning clubs
Recopa Sudamericana winning clubs
Copa Interamericana winning clubs